Hoseynabad-e Kordehha Rural District is a rural district (dehestan) in the Central District of Aradan County, Semnan Province, Iran. The rural district was created out of Yateri Rural District in 2011. At the 2006 census, its population was 2,219, in 649 families.  The rural district has 7 villages.

References 

Rural Districts of Semnan Province
Aradan County
2011 establishments in Iran